This is the discography for Tanya Anisimova.

1995
"Music from Mt. San Angelo," produced by the Virginia Center for the Creative Arts.  Contents: Anisimova's transcription of Partita #2 in D minor, BWV 1004 for solo violin by J.S. Bach; Anisimova's own "Song on Mt. San Angelo"
works for cello solo inspired by and composed for Anisimova: 
 "For Tanya" by David Del Tredici
 "A Single Voice" by Ezra Laderman
 "River God" by Frances Thompson McKay 
 "Blues Impromptu for Solo Cello" by Gary Powell Nash

2000-2001
2-CD Album, J.S. Bach, “Six Sonatas and Partitas for Solo Violin,” BWV 1001-1006

Celle-stial Records Company, arranged for cello and performed by Tanya Anisimova
First recording of the complete cycle on modern cello. Original keys were used apart from Partitas 1 & 3

2002-2004
J.S. Bach, Six Suites for Solo Cello, Celle-stial Records Company, BWV 1007-1012
 Vol. 1: Suites Nos. 3 & 5 performed scordatura 
 Vol. 2: Suite No. 2 includes performer's improvisations; Suites Nos.4 & 6 are transposed

2003
“Concert in Moscow,” Celle-stial Records Company
Recorded live during Anisimova's solo recital at the Chamber Hall (Maly Sal), 
The Moscow Conservatory, September, 2002 
Contents: J.S. Bach, Suite No.5, Suite No.3, Adagio & Fugue from Sonata No.1 for Solo Violin
Prelude from Partita No.3 for Solo Violin, Ezra Laderman, “A Single Voice,” Tanya Anisimova, “Song on Mt. San Angelo,” “September 11,” R.U.E. Tagel, Flamenco

2006
“Sufi Soul” Celle-stial Records Company
Recorded live during Anisimova's concerts at the Chamber Hall (Maly Sal), June, 2006 
Contents: performer's original compositions and improvisations with her vocal accompaniment 
“Sufi Suite” for cello scordatura
“Mexico – Moscow” for cello and piano (with Vitaly Yunitsky, piano)
Quintet – Concerto for Cello Solo and String Quartet (with the Prokofiev String Quartet)
“ADONAI” for Cello Solo and String Orchestra (with “Provintsia” Chamber Orchestra, conductor Igor Lerman)

2007
“Mystical Strings-Enchanted Cello,” produced by the Synchronicity Foundation
Contents: “Sourceful Awareness,” “Blissful Moments” 
Anisimova's improvisations accompanied by Master Charles Cannon's Technology of Balance

Works
Caravan for Two Cellos, 2007
Trio – Toccata for Violin, Piano and Cello, 2007
Adonai for cello solo and a string orchestra, 2006
Sufi Suite for cello scordatura, 2006
Mexico-Moscow for cello and piano, 2005
Quintet – Concerto for Solo Cello and String Quartet, 2005
“Cynthia” for flute and cello, 2004
Souvenir from St. Petersburg for solo cello, 2003
September 11, Chaconne for solo sello, 2001
Voice of Chechenia for cello and piano, 2000
“A Morning Star” for Three Cellos, 1999
A Song on Mt. San Angelo for solo cello, 1995

Transcriptions and arrangements for cello
J.S. Bach, Complete Sonatas and Partitas for Violin Solo 
F. Francouer, Sonata for Two Cellos (originally for Violin and Cembalo in E Major)
P. Locatelli, Sonata for Cello and Piano (originally for Violin and Continuo)
Beethoven, Sonatas for Violin and Piano, Op. 47 and Op. 96
Brahms, Complete Violin and Piano Sonatas
Sarasate, Playera and Gipsy Aires
M. Marais, La Folia for Solo Cello
Diniku, Hora-Staccatto

Discographies of Russian artists
Classical music discographies